Steve Smith is an Australian cricketer and a former captain of the Australian national team. , Smith has played 96 Test and 140 One Day International (ODI) matches for Australia, and has scored 30 and 12 centuries in the respective formats. His batting average of 62.84 is the third-highest in Test cricket history.

Smith made his Test debut against Pakistan in July 2010 at Lord's. His first Test century came during the fifth match of the 2013 Ashes series when he scored 138 not out. His highest score of 239 came against the same team during the 2017–18 series at the WACA Ground, Perth. Smith has scored Test centuries at eighteen different cricket grounds, including twelve at venues outside Australia. In terms of centuries, he has been most successful against England (11). , he ranks joint third in the list of most centuries by an Australian in Tests. He topped the ICC Test Rankings for the best batsman in the years 2015, 2016 and 2017; on 30 December 2017 he achieved a rating of 947, the second highest of all time after Don Bradman. As a result of his involvement in the 2018 Australian ball-tampering scandal, Smith was subsequently banned from all forms of cricket, except club level, for a year in March 2018.

Smith made his ODI debut against West Indies in February 2010. He did not bat in the match but took two wickets for 78 runs. His first century in the  format came against Pakistan at the Sharjah Cricket Stadium in October 2014; he was named the man of the match for his match-winning innings of 101. His highest ODI score of 164 came against New Zealand at the Sydney Cricket Ground in December 2016; he captained Australia in the match which they won by 68 runs. Smith has scored his ODI centuries at eight different cricket grounds, including two at venues outside Australia, one each against Pakistan, India and South Africa. He has scored twelve centuries in ODIs and is in fifth position in the ODI centuries list for Australia.

He has played 63 Twenty20 International (T20I) matches without scoring a century; his highest score in the format is 90. , he is joint fourteenth in the list of players who have scored the most centuries in international cricket.

Key
 *  Remained not out
   Man of the match
   Captain of Australia in that match

Test centuries

One Day International centuries

Notes

References

External links
Steve Smith at Howstat

Smith
Smith, Steve